Mionochroma elegans is a species of beetle in the family Cerambycidae. It was described by Olivier in 1790. It is known from Guadeloupe, Grenada, Dominica, and St. Lucia.

References

 WOODRUFF R. E., BECK B. M., SKELLEY P. E., SCHOTMAN C. Y. L. & THOMAS M. C. (1998) Checklist and Bibliography of The Insects of Grenada and The Grenadines, Memoir Series of the Center for Systematic Entomology, Gainesville : 1–286. The Sandhill Crane Press, Inc. .
 MONNÉ Miguel Ángel (1993) Catalogue of the Cerambycidae (Coleoptera) of the western hemisphere. Part VIII. Subfamily Cerambycinae: Tribes Saphanini, Callichromatini, Compsocerini, Rosaliini, Dryobiini, and Callidiini, Sociedade Brasileira de Entomologia, São Paulo 1993 VIII: 1-97.
 DUFFY Evelyn A. J. (1960) A monograph of the immature stages of Neotropical timber beetles (Cerambycidae), British Museum (Natural History), London : vii + 327, 176 figs & 13 pls, frontispice.
 BLACKWELDER Richard Eliott (1946) Checklist of the coleopterous insects of Mexico, Central America, the West Indies and South America. Part 4., Bulletin of the United States National Museum, Washington D. C. 185 (4): 551–763.
 SCHMIDT Martin (1924) Die amerikanischen Callichrominen (Col. Ceramb.) nach systematischen und phylogenetischen Gesichtspunkten dargestellt., Deutsche entomologische Zeitschrift, Berlin 1924 (4): 297–321.
 LENG C. W. & MUTCHLER A. J. (1917) Supplement to Preliminary List of the Coleoptera of the West Indies, Bulletin of the American Museum of Natural History, New York 37 (5): 191–220.
 LENG C. W. & MUTCHLER A. J. (1914) A Preliminary List of the Coleoptera of the West Indies as Recorded to January 1, 1914., Bulletin of the American Museum of Natural History, New York 33 (30): 391–493.
 AURIVILLIUS Christopher (1912) Cerambycidae : Cerambycinae, Coleopterorum Catalogus pars 39 [vol. 22]: 1–574. W. Junk & S. Schenkling, Berlin.
 GAHAN Charles Joseph (1895) On the Longicorn Coleoptera of the West Indian Islands, The Transactions of the Entomological Society of London 1895: 79–140, 1 pl.
 FLEUTIAUX E. & SALLÉ A. (1889) Liste des Coléoptères de la Guadeloupe et descriptions d'espèces nouvelles, Annales de la Société Entomologique de France, Paris (6) 9: 351–484, pls 7–8.
 GEMMINGER Max & von HAROLD Edgar (1872) Catalogus coleopterorum hucusque descriptorum synonymicus et systematicus, Sumptu E. H. Gummi (G. Beck) Monachii. 9: 2669–2988.
 LACORDAIRE Jean Théodore (1869) Histoire Naturelle des Insectes. Genera des Coléoptères ou exposé méthodique et critique de tous les genres proposés jusqu'ici dans cet ordre d'insectes. Famille des longicornes (suite)., Paris. Librairie Encyclopédique de Roret. 9 (1): 1–409.
 WHITE Adam (1853) Longicornia I., Catalogue of the coleopterous insects in the collection of the British Museum, London 7:1-174, pls. 1–4.
 DEJEAN Pierre François Marie Auguste (1835) Catalogue des coléoptères de la collection de M. le Comte Dejean, Méquignon-Marvis Père & Fils, 2e ed. livraison 4: 257–360. Paris.
 SCHÖNHERR Carl Johann (1817) Synonymia insectorum, oder : Versuch einer Synonymie Aller bisher bekannten Insecten ; nach Fabricii Systema Eleutheratorum &:c. geordnet, Skara, Lewerentzischen Buchdrükerey 1 (3): xi + 1–506.
 FABRICIUS Johann Christian (1801) Systema eleutheratorum secundum ordines, genera, species : adiectis synonymis, locis, observationibus, descriptionibus, Bibliopoli Academici Novi, Kiliae 2: 1–687.
 OLIVIER Guillaume-Antoine (1795) Entomologie ou Histoire Naturelle des Insectes, avec leurs caractères génériques et spécifiques, leur description, leur synonymie et leur figure enluminée, Coléoptères. Imprimerie de Lanneau, Paris 4: 519 pp, 75 pls.
 FABRICIUS Johann Christian (1793) Entomologia systematica emendata et aucta. Secundum classes ordines, genera, species adjectis synonymis, locis, observationibus, descriptionibus, Hafniae, C. G. Proft 1 (2): xx + 1–538.

External links

 
 Mionochroma elegans at Biolib

Callichromatini
Beetles described in 1790